Titanic is a 1943 German propaganda film made during World War II in Berlin by Tobis Productions for UFA, depicting the catastrophic sinking of  in 1912. This was the third German language dramatization of the event, following  a silent film released in 1912 just four weeks after the sinking and a British produced German film about the disaster in 1929. Titanic was commissioned by Nazi Propaganda Minister Joseph Goebbels with the intent of showing not only the superiority of German filmmaking, but also as a propaganda vehicle which would depict British and American capitalism as being responsible for the disaster. The addition of an entirely fictional heroic German officer to the ship's crew was intended to demonstrate the superior bravery and selflessness of German men as compared to the British officers.

The film's original director, Herbert Selpin, was arrested during production after making disparaging comments about the German army and the war in the east. He was found hanged in prison, and the film was completed by Werner Klingler, who was not credited.

Although the film had a brief theatrical run in parts of German-occupied Europe starting in November 1943, it was not shown within Germany by order of Goebbels, who feared that it would weaken the German citizenry's morale instead of improving it, as heavy Allied bombing raids made a film depicting mass panic and death unappealing. Goebbels later banned the playing of the film entirely, and it did not have a second run.

The film was the first on the subject which was simply titled Titanic, and the first to combine various fictional characters and subplots with the true events of the sinking; both conventions went on to become a staple of Titanic films.

Plot
A proclamation to the stockholders of the White Star Line declares the value of their stock is falling. The president of the Line, J. Bruce Ismay (E.F. Fürbringer), promises to reveal a secret during the maiden voyage of the line's new  which will change that. He alone knows she can break the speed record and receive the Blue Riband, and he believes this will raise the stock's value. Ismay and the board of the White Star Line plan to manipulate the stock by selling short their own stock in order to buy it back at a lower price just before the news about the ship's record speed is revealed to the press.

On Titanics maiden voyage in April 1912, First Officer Petersen (Hans Nielsen), the sole German crew member on board, begs the arrogant Bruce Ismay to slow the ship while sailing through ice-infested North Atlantic waters, but Ismay refuses and pressures the weak-willed Captain Smith (Otto Wernicke) to keep up the vessel's record-breaking speed. Because of Ismay's recklessness, Titanic hits an iceberg and begins to sink. The passengers in First Class act like cowards, while Petersen, his Russian aristocrat ex-lover Sigrid Olinsky (Sybille Schmitz), and several German passengers in steerage behave bravely and with dignity. With Sigrid's assistance, Petersen manages to rescue many passengers before convincing her to board one of the last lifeboats. He then arranges a seat for Ismay in order for him to stand trial for causing the disaster. As the water ravages through the ship, Petersen finds a young girl, left to die in her cabin by her uncaring capitalist parents. Petersen leaps from the sloping deck with the girl in his arms and is pulled aboard Sigrid's lifeboat, where the two are reunited; the occupants then watch in horror as Titanic plunges beneath the waves.

At the British Inquiry into the disaster, Petersen testifies against Ismay, condemning his actions, but Ismay is cleared of all charges and the blame is placed squarely on the deceased Captain Smith's shoulders. An epilogue states (in German): "The deaths of 1,500 people remain unatoned, an eternal condemnation of Britain's endless quest for profit."

Cast

 Sybille Schmitz as Sigrid Olinsky
 Hans Nielsen as 1st Officer Petersen
 Kirsten Heiberg as Gloria
 E.F. Fürbringer as Sir Bruce Ismay
 Karl Schönböck as John Jacob Astor
 Charlotte Thiele as Lady Astor
 Otto Wernicke as Captain Edward J. Smith
 Franz Schafheitlin as Hunderson
 Herbert Tiede as 2nd officer Lightoller

 Sepp Rist as Jan
 Monika Burg as Maniküre Heidi
 Jolly Bohnert as Marcia
 Fritz Böttger as Lord Douglas
 Hermann Brix as Head of Orchestra Gruber
 Lieselott Klinger as Anne
 Theodor Loos as Privy Councillor Bergmann
 Karl Meixner as Hopkins
 Theo Shall as 1st Officer Murdoch

Production
After the Propaganda Ministry gave final script approval in March 1942, shooting of interior scenes began shortly thereafter at Tobis Film's Johannisthal Studios in Berlin. Beginning in May, 1942, exterior scenes were shot at the German-occupied Polish Baltic Sea port of Gdynia (renamed Gotenhafen), on board , a passenger liner that eventually shared Titanics fate; it was sunk a few days before the end of World War II by the Royal Air Force on May 3, 1945, with loss of life more than three times than that on the actual Titanic. The ship had been turned into a prison ship and filled with Jewish inmates that, according to one hypothesis, the Nazis had put there in hopes that the ship would be destroyed by the Allies. The scenes with the lifeboats were also filmed on the Baltic Sea.

Titanic endured many production difficulties, including a clash of egos, massive creative differences and general war-time frustrations. As filming progressed, more extravagant sets were demanded by Selpin, as well as additional resources from the German Navy – these demands were all approved by Goebbels, despite the mounting costs and the drain on the wartime German economy.

After one week of troubled shooting on Cap Arcona, with Allies bombing raids occurring not far away, Herbert Selpin called a crisis meeting where he made unflattering comments about the Kriegsmarine officers who were supposed to be marine consultants for the film, but were more interested in molesting female cast members. Selpin's close friend and the co-writer of the script, Walter Zerlett-Olfenius, reported him to the Gestapo, and Selpin was promptly arrested and personally questioned by Joseph Goebbels, who was the driving force behind the Titanic project. Selpin, however, did not retract his statement – infuriating Goebbels, since the Propaganda Minister had personally chosen Selpin to direct his propaganda epic. Within 24 hours of his arrest, Selpin was found hanged in his jail cell, which was ruled a suicide. It has been claimed that Selpin was killed on Goebbels' orders.  The cast and crew were angered by Selpin's death and attempted to retaliate, but Goebbels countered them by issuing a proclamation stating that anyone who shunned Zerlett-Olfenius, who had reported Selpin, would answer to him personally. The unfinished film, on which the production costs were spiralling wildly out of control, was in the end completed by an uncredited Werner Klingler.

The film cost almost  (equivalent to roughly US$15 million in 2020 terms), although various sources have erroneously propagated an inflation-adjusted figure as high as $180 million. Regardless, it was the most expensive German production to that point.

Themes and propaganda context
The faults of capitalism and the stock market play a dominant role throughout the film. Titanic makes the allegory of the liner's loss specifically about British "avarice" rather than, as most retellings do, about "hubris". This fits in with other works of anti-British propaganda of the time such as The Maiden Joanna (1935), The Heart of a Queen (1940), The Fox of Glenarvon (1940), Uncle Krüger (1941), and My Life for Ireland (1941).

Undermining the intended effect were the scenes of British and French passengers in a state of panic and desperation. Scenes of steerage passengers separated by crew members and desperately searching for their loved ones through locked gates and a chain link fence bore an uncanny resemblance to what was happening in German extermination camps during that time. This contributed to the film being banned by Goebbels inside Germany.

The epilogue at the end of the film unambiguously underscored the intent of the filmmakers:

Reception 
Titanic was to premiere in early 1943, but the theatre that housed the answer print was bombed by Royal Air Force planes the night before. The film went on to have a respectable premiere in Paris in November 1943 "where it was surprisingly well-received by its audience", and also played well in some other capital cities of Nazi-occupied Europe such as Prague. But Goebbels banned its playing in Germany altogether, stating that the German people – who were at that point going through almost nightly Allied bombing raids – were less than enthusiastic about seeing a film that portrayed mass death and panic. The Nazi leadership was also displeased with the manner in which the fictional character Petersen critiqued his superiors, which they regarded to be at odds with the Führerprinzip which demanded Germans unquestioningly obey the orders of their superiors.

Re-release and censorship 

Shortly after the war, Titanic (dubbed into Russian and with the opening credits removed to hide its origin) was screened across the Eastern Bloc as its anti-capitalist propaganda message was considered ideologically sound. The film was later reissued in 1949 but was quickly banned in most Allied-occupied territories until a censored version, deleting the final scene at the inquiry and several other moments of overt anti-British propaganda, was approved for distribution in West Germany. After the 1950s, Titanic went back into obscurity, sometimes showing on European television. A VHS of the censored version was released in Germany in 1992 and the same version was later released on DVD in Germany and Italy. The uncut version of Titanic was restored by Kino Video in 2005 and subsequently released on DVD and VHS. A Blu-ray release followed in 2017. The uncut version was not available outside North America until 2019, when it was released on Blu-ray in Germany by LEONINE Films.

Legacy

A Night to Remember
Four clips from the film were reused in the critically acclaimed 1958 British film A Night to Remember: two of the ship sailing in calm waters during the day, and two brief clips of a flooding walkway in the engine room.

In popular culture
 The entire film was screened at the BFI Southbank in London as a part of its "Titanic" season in April 2012.
 Nazi Titanic: Revealed is a documentary on the film which was aired on Channel 5 in the UK on 6 March 2012.  An extended version was also broadcast on the History Channel in North America under the title Nazi Titanic on April 14, 2012, and subsequently on the Military History Channel at various times since, including on April 15, 2018, marking the 106th anniversary of the ship's sinking.

See also

 List of films about the RMS Titanic
 Hotel Sacher (A similar nazi propaganda film from 1939, also starring Sybille Schmitz as a Russian socialite)
 List of Nazi propaganda films
 Nazism and cinema

References
Explanatory notes

Citations

Bibliography

External links
 
 
 Article at Turner Classic Movies website
 Review of Titanic and two other Nazi-era movies; Bright Lights Film Journal
 Analysis of a Nazi Titanic; Jared Poley, New German Review
 The Nazi Titanic (1943) ; Watch Old Movies Online

1943 films
1940s disaster films
Nazi World War II propaganda films
Films about RMS Titanic
German black-and-white films
Films of Nazi Germany
Films set in 1912
German disaster films
Films directed by Werner Klingler
Films directed by Herbert Selpin
Tobis Film films
German historical drama films
Films shot at Johannisthal Studios
1940s German-language films